Raqqeh is a village in Raqqeh Rural District of Eresk District, Boshruyeh County, South Khorasan province, Iran. At the 2006 National Census, its population was 1,005 in 274 households, when it was in the former Boshruyeh District of Ferdows County. The following census in 2011 counted 1,066 people in 312 households, by which time the district had been separated from the county and Boshruyeh County established. The latest census in 2016 showed a population of 1,096 people in 350 households; it was the largest village in its rural district.

References 

Boshruyeh County

Populated places in South Khorasan Province

Populated places in Boshruyeh County